Barma is a crater on Mercury. It has a diameter of 128 kilometers. Its name was adopted by the International Astronomical Union in 1982. Barma is named for the Russian architect Ivan Barma, who lived in the 16th century.

Barma is south of Takayoshi crater.

References

Impact craters on Mercury